Helen Silving-Ryu (8 March 1906, Kraków, Poland-1993) was the first female law professor in the United States  

Silving-Ryu was the only female scholar mentored by Austrian philosopher and jurist, Hans Kelsen. Silving-Ryu and Kelsen collaborated extensively during her time at Harvard University.

Personal life
Helen was born on March 8, 1906, in Kraków. Daughter of Szaje Chaim and Sara vel Salomea (Bauminger) Silberpfennig. Came to the United States, 1939.

On January 3, 1959, Silving married Paul K. Ryu at the home of New York University’s chancellor, George D. Stoddard.
 
Silving met Ryu during her time at Harvard University. They intellectually collaborated over the course of their life together on publicational works on the topics of law, freedom, and justice.

Major publications

References

1909 births
1993 deaths
Columbia University alumni
Harvard University faculty
Lawyers from Kraków
People from Kraków
Polish emigrants to the United States